Australia competed at the 1992 Winter Paralympics in Tignes and Albertville in France. They were the first winter Paralympics to be celebrated concurrently with the Olympic Games. The official logo of the Games was designed by Jean-Michel Folon. It depicts a bird with broken wings, soaring high across the peak of a mountain. This was used to reflect the sporting abilities of the athletes at the Games. The official mascot, Alpy, designed by Vincent Thiebaut, represented the summit of the Grande Motte mountain in Tignes. Alpy was shown on a mono-ski to demonstrate its athleticism and the colours of white, green and blue were used to represent purity/snow, hope/nature and discipline/the lake. The 1992 Games were where Australia won their first winter medals at the Paralympics. Michael Milton won Australia's first gold with a win in the Men's Slalom LW2.  Milton also won a silver medal in the Men's Super G LW2. At these Games, Australia was represented by 5 male athletes. Australia was placed 12th in the overall medal tally for the Winter Games winning a total of 4 medals: 1 gold, 1 silver and 2 bronze.

Background

Selection of the host city
On 16 October 1986 at the IOC session in Lausanne, Switzerland Albertville in France was awarded the right to host the 1992 winter Olympic Games. Almost a year earlier in November 1985 André Auberger, President of the French Sport Federation for the Disabled, had written to Michel Barnier, President of the French Olympic bid committee, to request that they also consider hosting the Paralympic Games should their Olympic bid be successful. On November 3rd1986 Barnier confirmed his support to the request and on 31 January 1987 at the meeting of the International Co-ordinating Committee in Copenhagen, Denmark the right to host the 1992 winter Paralympic Games was awarded to France. The contract was finally signed on 22 April 1989.

Opening ceremony
The opening ceremony for the Tignes winter Paralympic Games commenced at 4.00pm on Wednesday 25 March at the foot of the main competition pistes for the Games. Guest of Honour for the ceremony was President of the French Republic Francois Mitterrand who arrived at 5.00pm. The delegations entered the arena in French alphabetical order and every 45 seconds a para-glider in the colours of each country descended into the arena and spread out in front of the delegations. Short speeches by the President of the ICC Jens Broman and the French President were followed by the official opening of the Games by President Mitterrand. This was followed by the entrance of the Paralympic flame and the lighting of the Olympic cauldron by French Nordic skier Luc Sabatier assisted by Fabrice Guy. The athletes and officials oaths were then taken by Ludovic Rey-Robert on behalf of the athletes and a currently unknown female official. This was followed by an aerobatic display by six hang-gliders over the stadium to music by French composer Michel Colombier, choreographed by American dancer Dany Ezralow with the harmonica solo being performed by Belgian musician Toots Thielemans. The ceremony ended with the release of balloons to the strains of ‘The Ode to Joy’ followed by the exit of the team delegations.

The Games themselves
Despite being badged as Tignes-Albertville in all publicity material the fifth winter Paralympic Games actually only took place in Tignes. The fact that the Games only took place in Tignes where there were no ice sport venues, combined with an apparent lack of entries from the nations in ice sport events, meant that only Alpine and Nordic events were held. A total of 365 athletes from 24 nations competed in 79 medal events. For the first time, demonstration events in Alpine and Nordic Skiing for athletes with an intellectual disability and Biathlon for the visually impaired were added to the programme. In addition, this was the first time at a Winter Paralympics that the athletes were all accommodated in an Athlete's Village as opposed to hotels, which had been the case at previous winter Games. The Games were officially opened by French President Francois Mitterrand with the Opening Ceremony and all other ceremonial events being held in front of the finish area for the Alpine Skiing events. This area was named the Lognan Stadium. The Games were covered by 300 journalists and 15 reporters from various television channels. According to the Official Report the Games cost 41,638,810.98 French Francs and actually made a small profit of 392,471.73 French Francs.

Closing ceremony
The closing ceremony for the Tignes winter Paralympic Games commenced at 5.00pm on Wednesday 1 April at the foot of the main competition pistes for the Games. The ceremony was attended by Michel Gillibert, State Secretary to the Handicapped and Life Injured, paralysed French sailor Florence Arthaud, who acted as Godmother to the French Paralympic team in Tignes, the Mayor of Lillehammer, hosts to the next winter Paralympic Games in 1994 and representatives from COPTA, ICC and Tignes. The closing ceremony was a simple affair. There was a parade of nations and a descent of all the medal winners together. The ceremony concluded with the extinguishing of the flame and the take-off of a deltaplane bearing the broken-winged bird ‘Folon’ symbol, which flew away into the distance.

Athletes

Michael Milton - Alpine Skiing

Michael Norton - Alpine Skiing

David Munk - Alpine Skiing

Rod Hacon - Alpine Skiing

Kyrra Grunnsund - Alpine Skiing

David McPherson - Alpine Skiing

Notable performances

Michael Milton won a gold medal in the Men's Slalom LW2 event, for which he received a Medal of the Order of Australia, and a silver medal in the Men's Super-G LW2 event. He became the first Australian to win a gold medal at a winter Olympics or Paralympics. That year he also won the slalom in the Austrian championships, and in 1993 he won both the slalom and super giant slalom at the Columbia Crest Cup.

Michael Norton won a bronze medal for his efforts in the Men's Slalom LW11

David Munk also won a bronze medal for his Men's Super-G LW11 run

Medal winners

Administration
Team officials were:

Graeme Morris (Manager/Head Coach);

Dean Sheppard (assistant coach);

Eddie Jesiolowski, David Howells and Alan Dean (Team Assistants)

Events
The 5 athletes who competed at these Games were involved in 4 of the 5 available alpine skiing events. These events were: Downhill, Slalom, Giant Slalom and Super-G. The only alpine skiing event that no Australian participated in was Super Combined. A short description of these events are as follows:

Downhill
Each athlete competes one run down the course with their finish time determining the final order based on ascending time. Athletes ski down a long, steep course and must pass through a relatively few number of gates. If an athlete misses a gate they are disqualified. For weather, safety and other reasons, the jury can decide to have two-run downhill if the vertical drop does not comply.

Slalom
Each athlete competes two runs on the same day on different courses. Times from the two runs are added together to determine the final order based on ascending total time. It is a technical event over a shorter course than other events but with a high number of gates that the athlete must negotiate. If an athlete misses a gate they are disqualified.

Giant slalom
Each athlete completes two runs on the same day on different courses. Times from the two runs are added together to determine the final order based on ascending total time. It is a technical event with a longer course and fewer gates than the slalom. The number of gates is determined by the vertical drop of the course. If an athlete misses a gate they are disqualified.

Super-G
A speed event where each athlete completes one run down the course with their finish time determining the final order based on ascending time. The course is generally shorter than downhill but longer than slalom and giant slalom.

Super combined
A combined competition which represents the final result of two disciplines - usually one of either a downhill or super-G and a single run of slalom. Each athlete competes two runs on the same day on different courses. Times from the two runs are added together to determine the final order based on ascending total time.

Classifications

Standing skiers

 LW1 - standing: double leg amputation above the knee
 LW2 - standing: single leg amputation above the knee
 LW3 - standing: double leg amputation below the knee, mild cerebral palsy, or equivalent impairment
 LW4 - standing: single leg amputation below the knee
 LW5/7 - standing: double arm amputation
 LW6/8 - standing: single arm amputation
 LW9 - standing: amputation or equivalent impairment of one arm and one leg

Sitting skiers 

 LW10 - sitting: paraplegia with no or some upper abdominal function and no functional sitting balance
 LW11 - sitting: paraplegia with fair functional sitting balance
 LW12 - sitting: double leg amputation above the knees, or paraplegia with some leg function and good sitting balance

Visual impairments
 B1 - visually impaired: no functional vision
 B2 - visually impaired: up to ca 3-5% functional vision
 B3 - visually impaired: under 10% functional vision

In IPC Alpine Skiing, you will see athletes with visual impairment skiing with a guide. The guide skis in front of the athlete and verbally gives directions to the athlete.

Results

David McPherson a sit skier was forced top withdraw from the team prior to Games due to a fall in Thredbo, New South Wales in September 1991.

Participating nations

Below is a list of all 24 Nations that participated in the Games:
Australia
Austria
Belgium
Canada
Czechoslovakia
Denmark
Estonia
Finland
France
Germany
Great Britain
Italy
Japan
Liechtenstein
Netherlands
New Zealand
Norway
Poland
South Korea
Spain
Sweden
Switzerland
United States
Unified Team
Countries appearing in bold are those appearing at a Winter Paralympic Games for the first time

See also
 Australia at the Winter Paralympics
1992 Winter Paralympics
Australia at the 1992 Summer Paralympics

References

Nations at the 1992 Winter Paralympics
1992
Paralympics